Osichki is a rural locality (a selo) and the administrative center of Osichkovskoye Rural Settlement, Rudnyansky District, Volgograd Oblast, Russia. The population was 555 as of 2010. There are 8 streets.

Geography 
Osichki is located in steppe, on the Khopyorsko-Buzulukskaya Plain, 19 km north of Rudnya (the district's administrative centre) by road. Tarapatino is the nearest rural locality.

References 

Rural localities in Rudnyansky District, Volgograd Oblast